Eleutherodactylus portoricensis (vernacular Spanish: coquí de la montaña) is a frog native to Puerto Rico that belongs to the family Eleutherodactylidae. Its vernacular English names are upland coqui, mountain coqui, and Puerto Rican robber frog.  The species’ range spans the Luquillo Mountains (Sierra de Luquillo) of northeastern Puerto Rico and the Cordillera Central, which forms the highland “backbone” of Puerto Rico and includes an eastern extension beginning at the city of Cayey. However, the species is likely extirpated from the western Cordillera Central (west of Cayey).

History and nomenclature
The history of this species is quite complex, just as that of the common coquí (Eleutherodactylus coqui). In 1927 Eleutherodactylus portoricensis was described as the Puerto Rican coquí and it was classified as a species that lived only in Puerto Rico and which is different from species that live in other Caribbean islands. As such, it was classified as a new species (Schmidt, 1927).  From 1927 to 1966 the nighttime CO-QUI sound was thought to correspond to a species of coquí that lived in the entire Island, in high elevations as well as in lower elevations alike (Schmidt, 1928; Thomas, 1966).  However, in the winter of 1964-65, Richard Thomas becomes aware that this sound was produced not by one, but by two species. In 1966 this researcher publishes an article in which he establishes that the sample that Schmidt used to describe Eleutherodactylus portoricensis corresponded to a species that lived only in the higher elevations and which is today known as the coquí de montaña. Of the 16 species of coquíes in Puerto Rico, this is the ninth species classified (Thomas & Joglar, 1996). There is no other scientific name for this species. The common name in Spanish is coquí de la montaña. However, there are other common names. In his catalogue of vertebrates in Puerto Rico, Vélez (1977) uses the common name "coquí montaño de Puerto Rico" and in English "Puerto Rico mountain coqui”. In his book on the herpetofauna of Puerto Rico, Rivero (1978) uses the name "coquí de montaña". It is one of the only two species to actually emit the sound "coqui", the other one being the common coqui. Above its eyes, this species has a white half-moon, and in its belly, it has dark-brown spots. These characteristics make it easy to identify.

Habitat
Its natural habitats are subtropical or tropical moist lowland forests and subtropical or tropical moist montane forests at elevations above 180 m. It has been documented in shrubs, palms, herbaceous plants, bromeliads, tree holes, and under rocks, trunks, roots, and leaf litter.

Evolutionary history and conservation
The low-elevation Caguas Basin in eastern Puerto Rico is a long-term barrier to gene flow between populations of E. portoricensis in the Luquillo and Cayey Mountains, with population divergence beginning more than 75 ka. Stable population sizes over time indicate a lack of demographic response to climatic changes during the last glacial period. The results highlight the importance of topographic complexity in promoting within-island allopatric speciation in the Greater Antilles, and indicate long-term persistence and lineage diversification despite Quaternary climatic oscillations. The species has undergone considerable declines throughout its range and is listed as endangered. Captive breeding programs are being used to help conserve E. portoricensis.

See also

Fauna of Puerto Rico
List of amphibians and reptiles of Puerto Rico

References

portoricensis
Amphibians of Puerto Rico
Endemic fauna of Puerto Rico
Amphibians described in 1927
Taxa named by Karl Patterson Schmidt
Taxonomy articles created by Polbot
Cayey, Puerto Rico
Greater Antilles